The 1954–55 NHL season was the 38th season of the National Hockey League. The Detroit Red Wings were the Stanley Cup champions as they defeated the Montreal Canadiens four games to three in the best-of-seven final series. The Canadiens were without star forward Maurice 'Rocket' Richard who had been suspended for the playoffs, a suspension which led to the March 17, 1955 "Richard Riot" in Montreal.

League business
Art Ross announced at the league governors meeting that his connection with Boston would terminate at the end of September. As this would be his last appearance at a league meeting, he took the opportunity to thank the governors and others associated with the league during the 30 years of his being officer of the Boston club for the kindness, courtesy and cooperation he had received, and extended his good wishes for the continued success of the league. Conn Smythe and Frank Selke voiced the good wishes of all present to Ross on his retirement.

Prior to the season, Red Wings head coach Tommy Ivan left Detroit to become general manager of the Chicago Black Hawks, and Jimmy Skinner replaced him behind the bench in the Motor City. One of the first things Ivan did at Chicago was to establish an extensive farm system, something the Black Hawks never had.

Regular season
On December 18, 1954, Maurice Richard scored his 400th career goal against Chicago netminder Al Rollins in a 4–1 Canadiens victory over the Black Hawks. Montreal and Toronto played to a 1–1 tie on December 29, at Maple Leaf Gardens. Maurice Richard got a standing ovation when he scored his 401st goal late in the first period.

In a scoreless tie at the Montreal Forum on March 10, a new ice cleaner and resurfacer called a Zamboni was used for the first time. The fans were not appreciative of Toronto's defensive style in this game and threw garbage, including pig's feet, on the ice.

The Richard Riot took place on March 17, 1955. Maurice Richard had been suspended by league president Clarence Campbell after an incident in a game against Boston where Richard punched the referee. Richard was suspended for the rest of the season and the playoffs. Campbell's subsequent appearance at a Canadiens' game at the Montreal Forum incited a group of protesters and led to violence in the Forum and in downtown Montreal.

Final standings

Playoffs

Playoff bracket

Semifinals

(1) Detroit Red Wings vs. (3) Toronto Maple Leafs

(2) Montreal Canadiens vs. (4) Boston Bruins

Stanley Cup Finals

Awards

Player statistics

Scoring leaders
Note: GP = Games played, G = Goals, A = Assists, PTS = Points, PIM = Penalties in minutes

Source: NHL

Leading goaltenders

Note: GP = Games played; Min – Minutes played; GA = Goals against; GAA = Goals against average; W = Wins; L = Losses; T = Ties; SO = Shutouts

Coaches
Boston Bruins: Milt Schmidt
Chicago Black Hawks: Frank Eddolls
Detroit Red Wings: Jimmy Skinner
Montreal Canadiens: Dick Irvin
New York Rangers: Muzz Patrick
Toronto Maple Leafs: King Clancy

Debuts
The following is a list of players of note who played their first NHL game in 1954–55 (listed with their first team, asterisk(*) marks debut in playoffs):
Don McKenney, Boston Bruins
Don Cherry*, Boston Bruins (only NHL game of career)
Charlie Hodge, Montreal Canadiens
Jean-Guy Talbot, Montreal Canadiens
Lou Fontinato, New York Rangers
Dick Duff, Toronto Maple Leafs

Last games
The following is a list of players of note that played their last game in the NHL in 1954–55 (listed with their last team):
Gus Bodnar, Boston Bruins
Milt Schmidt, Boston Bruins
Jim Henry, Boston Bruins
Bill Mosienko, Chicago Black Hawks
Paul Ronty, Montreal Canadiens
Edgar Laprade, New York Rangers
Bill Ezinicki, New York Rangers
Don Cherry, Boston Bruins (Only NHL game of his career)

Intraleague draft
After two years of uneventful draft meetings the NHL intra-league draft meeting on September 15, 1954, the first player was selected for a price of $15,000.

All other teams forwent making a selection.

See also
1954-55 NHL transactions
List of Stanley Cup champions
8th National Hockey League All-Star Game
National Hockey League All-Star Game
1954 in sports
1955 in sports

References

 
 
 
 

 

 
Notes

External links
Hockey Database
NHL.com

 
1954–55 in American ice hockey by league
1954–55 in Canadian ice hockey by league